Regular-Irregular is the first studio album by South Korean boy band NCT 127, the second sub-unit of the South Korean boy band NCT. Described as a multi-genre concept album with a total of eleven tracks, the album was released by SM Entertainment on October 12, 2018, and distributed by IRIVER. This marks NCT 127's first Korean major release in a year and four months since their previous EP, Cherry Bomb, which was released in June 2017. It is also their first release as a ten-member group since the addition of Jungwoo in September 2018.

Upon its release, Regular-Irregular attained commercial success in both South Korea and other countries. The album debuted atop the Gaon Album Chart and became one of the few releases to stay longer than a single week at No. 1 in 2018. Additionally, it debuted at No. 86 on the US Billboard 200 in the week of October 27, 2018, thus becoming NCT 127's first entry on the chart. It is also the group's highest charting release on the UK and France's download albums charts and first entry on the Australian Digital Albums chart.

The album's repackage, Regulate, was released on November 23, 2018, along with its lead single, "Simon Says".

Background and release

Regular-Irregular
On September 17, a teaser video was released on the group's Twitter account which shows flashes of the words "regular" and "irregular", as well as a new NCT 127 logo. Later that day, SM Entertainment announced the addition of Jungwoo to the group and that NCT 127 would release its first full-length album Regular-Irregular on October 12. Following the announcement, NCT 127 entered the Billboard's Social 50 at number five for the week of September 29. Photo and video teasers were released from September 18 up to October 11.

On October 8, NCT 127 released the music video of the English version of their new single "Regular", which marks the group's first English-language song. The music video for the Korean version of "Regular" was released on October 11, 2018. The album was released on October 12, 2018.

Regulate
On November 13, 2018, NCT 127 announced the release of the album's repackage, Regulate with teasers of the members. The album and its lead single, "Simon Says", released on November 23, 2018.

Composition
The album's theme revolves around the exploration reality and dreams. The album incorporates several genres; such as pop, dance, R&B, ballad and hip-hop.
 
"Regular" is described as a high-energy hip hop track with sensual Latin vibes that incorporates Spanish lyrics. Billboard noted that unlike many Korean songs re-released by K-pop bands in other languages, the English version of "Regular" differentiates itself from the Korean version through the content of their lyrics. The Korean one addresses their current state as a group trying to make its way in the world, in contrast to the hopeful, goal-oriented swagger expressed in the English alternative. While both versions focus on money, the Korean addresses the reality of their world versus the luxurious lifestyle expressed in the English.

The sixth track, "Interlude: Regular to Irregular" contains the music used in the video "NCT 2018 Yearbook #1" as well as a rearranged version of a future bass composition (titled "The 7th Sense – Reverse") by Korean electronica musician Hitchhiker that was performed by the sub-unit in the 2017 Mnet Asian Music Awards. The track also contains narrations done in Korean (by new member Jungwoo), Japanese (by Yuta) and Mandarin (by Winwin), as well as a verse from the American author Edgar Allan Poe's 1849 poem "A Dream Within a Dream" narrated by member Johnny. The eighth track, "Come Back", is a Korean version of the originally released Japanese track off their debut Japanese EP Chain. The bonus track, "Run Back 2 U", is the full version of the demo song originally titled "Bassbot" previously performed by NCT members Johnny, Taeyong, Yuta, Ten and Jaehyun and then-SM trainee Hansol in a pre-debut video under the company's pre-debut group SM Rookies in 2015.

Promotion

Regular-Irregular
NCT 127 kick-started promotions for the album in the U.S. with television promotions and a partnership with Apple Music.

They performed their new single "Regular" as well as "Cherry Bomb" on the Jimmy Kimmel Live! outdoor concert series stage on October 8, marking their U.S. television debut;  The group also appeared at the 2018 American Music Awards.
They performed at ABC's Mickey's 90th Spectacular TV special on November 4.

NCT 127 was also announced as Apple Music's 'Up Next' Artist; the group was featured on Apple-based platforms, including a short film exploring the band and their music, an Apple Music–only choreography video, and a Beats 1 interview.

Regulate
On November 22, it was announced that member Winwin would not participate in promotions for Regulate as he was preparing for the group's Chinese activities.

NCT 127 performed "Simon Says" on Music Bank, Inkigayo, and Show! Music Core, as well as the Korean version of "Chain" on The Show and Show Champion.

Reception

Regular-Irregular
In a positive review, Billboard praised the album for showcasing both the group's artistry and skill through its diversity of sounds and experimental approach towards an album concept, helping to solidify their style.

Regulate
On December 10, it was announced that "Simon Says" had become the group's first song to chart at number one on the US Digital Song Sales chart.

Track listing
Credits adapted from Naver

Credits and personnel 
Credits adapted from Xiami.

 Seo Mi-rae (Butterfly)vocal directing , background vocals , digital editing 
 GDLO (MonoTree)vocal directing , digital editing 
 Chu Dae-kwan (MonoTree)vocal directing 
 DEEZvocal directing 
 Andrew Choivocal directing , background vocals 
 Double Dragon (Hot Sauce Music Group)vocal directing , digital editing 
 Kim Dong-hyunrap directing 
 250rap directing , digital editing 
 NCT 127vocals, background vocals
 Taeilvocals, background vocals 
 Johnnyvocals, background vocals 
 Taeyongvocals, background vocals 
 Yutavocals, background vocals 
 Doyoungvocals, background vocals 
 Jaehyunvocals, background vocals 
 Winwinvocals, background vocals 
 Jungwoovocals, background vocals 
 Markvocals, background vocals 
 Haechanvocals, background vocals 
 Micah Powellbackground vocals 
 DAWNbackground vocals 
 Wilbart "Vedo" McCoy IIIbackground vocals  
 Varren Wadebackground vocals 
 Ra.Dbackground vocals 
 BrotherSubackground vocals 
 J. Rostonbackground vocals 
 OneStar (MonoTree)background vocals 
 Bobii Lewisbackground vocals , all instruments 
 Yoo Young-jinbackground vocals , mixing engineer 
 Hwang Seong-je (Butterfly)background vocals 
 Megan Bowenbackground vocals 
 Kim Gyeong-minpiano 
 Hitchhickerguitar , digital editing 
 ON the stringstring 
 Choi Jin-seokall instruments 
 Jeong Ho-jinrecording 
 Choi Jin-yeongassistant recording 
 Kang Jae-gurecording 
 Hong Su-yeonassistant recording 
 Kwak Jeong-sinrecording 
 Jeong Mo-yeonrecording 
 Kwon Yoo-jinrecording 
 Hong Seong-junrecording , digital editing 
 Chu Dae-kwanrecording 
 Sin Dae-seoprecording 
 Jeong Gi-hongrecording 
 Choi Da-inrecording 
 Lee Chan-miassistant recording 
 On Seong-yoonrecording 
 Lee Ji-hongrecording , digital editing , mixing engineer 
 An Chang-gyurecording 
 Lee Min-gyurecording , mixing engineer , mixing 
 Juan "Jay P" Mendezdigital editing 
 Min Seong-soodigital editing 
 Jang Woo-yeongdigital editing 
 Jung Eui-seokdigital editing , mixing 
 Kim Cheol-sunmixing 
 Nam Gung-jinmixing 
 Kim Han-gumixing 
 Goo Jong-pil (BeatBurger)mixing

Locations

Recording 
 sound POOL studios
 GaeNaRi Sound
 The Vibe Studio
 doobdoob Studio
 MonoTree Studio
 YIREH STUDIO
 Seoul Studio
 SM Big Shot Studio

Editing
 doobdoob Studio
 GaeNaRi Sound
 SM LVYIN Studio

Mixing 
 SM Big Shot Studio
 SM LVYIN Studio
 SM Blue Cup Studio
 SM Blue Ocean Studio
 SM Concert Hall Studio
 SM BOOMINSYSTEM
 SM Yellow Tail Studio
 sound POOL studios

Charts

Album

Weekly charts

Year-end charts

Single

"Regular" weekly charts

"Simon Says" weekly charts

Sales

Certifications

Accolades

Music program awards

Release history

References

NCT 127 albums
SM Entertainment albums
2018 albums
Korean-language albums
IRiver albums